Phenylpropanolamine (PPA) is a sympathomimetic agent which is used as a decongestant and appetite suppressant. It was commonly used in prescription and over-the-counter cough and cold preparations. In veterinary medicine, it is used to control urinary incontinence in dogs.

Chemistry 

PPA is also known as β-hydroxyamphetamine, and is a member of the phenethylamine and amphetamine chemical classes. It is closely related to the cathinones (β-ketoamphetamines). The compound exists as four stereoisomers, which include d- and l-norephedrine and d- and l-norpseudoephedrine. d-Norpseudoephedrine is also known as cathine, and is found naturally in Catha edulis (khat). Pharmaceutical drug preparations of PPA have varied in their stereoisomer composition in different countries, which may explain differences in misuse and side effect profiles. Analogues of PPA include ephedrine, pseudoephedrine, amphetamine, methamphetamine, and cathinone.

PPA, structurally, is in the substituted phenethylamine class, consisting of a cyclic benzene or phenyl group, a two carbon ethyl moiety, and a terminal nitrogen, hence the name phen-ethyl-amine. The methyl group on the alpha carbon (the first carbon before the nitrogen group) also makes this compound a member of the substituted amphetamine class. Ephedrine is the N-methyl analogue of PPA.

Exogenous compounds in this family are degraded too rapidly by monoamine oxidase to be active at all but the highest doses. However, the addition of the α-methyl group allows the compound to avoid metabolism and confer an effect. In general, N-methylation of primary amines increases their potency; whereas β-hydroxylation decreases CNS activity, but conveys more selectivity for adrenergic receptors.

History 

Phenylpropanolamine was patented in 1938. In the United States, PPA is no longer sold due to an increased risk of haemorrhagic stroke. In a few countries in Europe, however, it is still available either by prescription or sometimes over-the-counter. In Canada, it was withdrawn from the market on 31 May 2001. It was voluntarily withdrawn from the Australian market by July 2001.  In India, human use of PPA and its formulations was banned on 10 February 2011, but the ban was overturned by the judiciary in September 2011.

Pharmacology

Mechanism of action 

Although originally thought to act as a direct agonist of adrenergic receptors, PPA was subsequently found to show only weak or negligible affinity for these receptors, and has been instead characterized as an indirect sympathomimetic which acts by inducing norepinephrine release and thereby activating adrenergic receptors.

Pharmacodynamics
PPA acts primarily as a selective norepinephrine releasing agent. It also acts as a dopamine releasing agent with around 10-fold lower potency. The stereoisomers of the drug have only weak or negligible affinity for α- and β-adrenergic receptors.

Many sympathetic hormones and neurotransmitters are based on the phenethylamine skeleton, and function generally in "fight or flight" type responses, such as increasing heart rate, blood pressure, dilating the pupils, increased energy, drying of mucous membranes, increased sweating, and a significant number of additional effects.

Activity profiles of isomers

Pharmacokinetics
Norephedrine is a metabolite of amphetamine, as shown below.

Drug interactions
Certain drugs increase the chances of déjà vu occurring in the user, resulting in a strong sensation that an event or experience currently being experienced has already been experienced in the past. Some pharmaceutical drugs, when taken together, have also been implicated in the cause of déjà vu. Taiminen and Jääskeläinen (2001) reported the case of an otherwise healthy male who started experiencing intense and recurrent sensations of déjà vu upon taking the drugs amantadine and phenylpropanolamine together to relieve flu symptoms. He found the experience so interesting that he completed the full course of his treatment and reported it to the psychologists to write up as a case study. Because of the dopaminergic action of the drugs and previous findings from electrode stimulation of the brain (e.g. Bancaud, Brunet-Bourgin, Chauvel, & Halgren, 1994), Taiminen and Jääskeläinen speculate that déjà vu occurs as a result of hyperdopaminergic action in the mesial temporal areas of the brain.

Legal status
In Sweden, PPA is still available in prescription decongestants, PPA is also still available in Germany. It is used in some polypill medications like Wick DayMed capsules.

In the United Kingdom, PPA was available in many "all in one" cough and cold medications which usually also feature paracetamol or another analgesic and caffeine and could also be purchased on its own; however, it is no longer approved for human use. A European Category 1 Licence is required to purchase PPA for academic use.

In the United States, the Food and Drug Administration (FDA) issued a public health advisory against the use of the drug in November 2000. In this advisory, the FDA requested but did not require that all drug companies discontinue marketing products containing PPA. The agency estimates that PPA caused between 200 and 500 strokes per year among 18-to-49-year-old users. In 2005, the FDA removed PPA from over-the-counter sale and removed its "generally recognized as safe and effective" (GRASE) status. Under the 2020 CARES Act, it requires FDA approval before it can be marketed again.

Because of its potential use in amphetamine manufacture, phenylpropanolamine is controlled by the Combat Methamphetamine Epidemic Act of 2005. It is still available for veterinary use in dogs, however, as a treatment for urinary incontinence.

Internationally, an item on the agenda of the 2000 Commission on Narcotic Drugs session called for including the stereoisomer norephedrine in Table I of United Nations Convention Against Illicit Traffic in Narcotic Drugs and Psychotropic Substances.

Drugs containing PPA were banned in India on 27 January 2011. On 13 September 2011, Madras High Court revoked a ban on manufacture and sale of pediatric drugs PPA and nimesulide.

Notes

Reference notes

References

External links 
 Phenylpropanolamine Information Page at FDA.gov (update, includes earlier reports)
 U.S. National Library of Medicine: Drug Information Portal – Phenylpropanolamine

Phenylethanolamines
Alpha-1 adrenergic receptor agonists
Alpha-2 adrenergic receptor agonists
Amphetamine alkaloids
Anorectics
Beta-adrenergic agonists
Decongestants
Norepinephrine releasing agents
Veterinary drugs
Withdrawn drugs